The 2022 season is Geylang International's 27th consecutive season in the top flight of Singapore football and in the Singapore Premier League. Along with the Singapore Premier League, the club will also compete in the Singapore Cup.

Squad

Singapore Premier League

U21

Coaching staff

Transfers

In

Pre-season 

Note 1: Joshua Pereira will only join the team in May 2022 after completing his NS.

Loan In 

Mid-season

Loan Return 

Pre-season 

Note 1: Danish Irfan subsequently moved to Tampines Rovers after his contract ended.

Out

Pre-season 

Note 1: Faisal Roslan subsequently returned to the club after his contract with Lion City Sailors ended. 

Mid-season

Loan Out 

Pre-season 

Note: Harith Kanadi, Elijah Lim and Zikos Vasileios Chua subsequently was snapped by Young Lions on loan for the season.

Extension / Retained

Rumored 

Pre-season

Friendlies

Pre-season friendlies

Mid-Season Friendly

Team statistics

Appearances and goals

Competitions

Overview

Results summary (SPL)

Singapore Premier League

Singapore Cup

Group

Competition (U21)

Stage 1

 League table

Stage 2

 League table

Competition (U17)

U17 League

League table

See also 
 2007 Geylang United FC season
 2008 Geylang United FC season
 2009 Geylang United FC season
 2010 Geylang United FC season
 2011 Geylang United FC season
 2012 Geylang International FC season
 2013 Geylang International FC season
 2014 Geylang International FC season
 2015 Geylang International FC season
 2016 Geylang International FC season
 2017 Geylang International FC season
 2018 Geylang International FC season
 2019 Geylang International FC season
 2020 Geylang International FC season
 2021 Geylang International FC season

Notes

References 

Geylang International FC
Geylang International FC seasons
2022
1